Asprovalta (Asproválta) is a town in the regional unit of Thessaloniki in northern Greece. It was the seat of the Agios Georgios municipality. Since the implementation of the Kallikratis Plan in January 2011, Asprovalta belongs to the Municipality of Volvi. Its population numbers 2,838 people.

History
Near the modern town, the ruins of a Roman station of the Via Egnatia are preserved which was called Pennana. According to a manuscript of Simonopetra monastery in Mount Athos, Asprovalta was built in the 16th century. Its first name was Aspra Valta. After the Asia Minor Disaster, 54 families from Erenköy of Troas (near the ancient city of Ophryneion) were installed forcefully in Asprovalta. Erenköy was located in an important geographical position from a military point of view. During WW1 near to the village a Turkish artillery had been settled, which was bombarded by the Allied ships. After the truce of Moudrou (30-10-1918) with which the war ended.

The settlement of Asia Minor refugees in Greece was one of the most important events of modern Greek history. Residents of Erenköy (most of them) were installed in rural and urban settlements all over Greece: Athens, Lamia, Kymi, Kalamata, Tripoli, Argos, Halkida, Crete.

But the most of the Erenkiotes gathered in Asprovalta in the prefecture of Thessaloniki, Kato Lakkovikia (Ophrynion) and at Nicaea after the second persecution.

In September 1923 they arrived with the ship <<Elpidoforos>> to Stavros 54 refugee families from Erenköy who had fled from Imvros.

Testimonies from locals 
In 1915, during the second year of war, people were ordered to leave. We went to Karantina where we were waiting for the boats to take us· Greek ships came named <<Granikos/Γρανικός>> and  <<Βαρβάρα/Varvára>>. People who board on the first one went straight to Almyros. The other one that we got ontook us to Peiraeus and the went to Kalamata and we stayed there around 5 years.

The persecution came unexpectedly. Nobody expected it. We just had harvested the vines and stored the wine. One day we heard the town crier that we have to leave from the town by morning. My father took us to Karantina and returned to Erenköy. The next day my mother was concerned, because he was late and she returned to find him drinking with his friends wine. Nobody thought that we would leave for ever. First we went to Krithia they gave us boards and we built shacks. After a while we charted boats and left for Imvros, but when we realised that the island had become Turkish we left from there also. We went to Asprovalta, and in the beginning we lived in shacks and tents.

Historical population

Historical Landmarks
Agios Georgios church (St George) was built in 1927-28 by the installed refugees from Erenköy. Divine Liturgy before the church was built was held at a shack and the religious artefacts were kept in 2-3 houses. Unfortunately, the church was demolished at the altar of the leaping tourist development in 1978. And a newer and bigger one was built from cement. Inside the (new) Church are kept historical icons carried by the Asia Minor as heirlooms: two icons of St. George and the Virgin Mary of the 16th - 17th century, the icon of St. Nicholas, two gold-embroidered icons and the school library. 

Agios Georgios church (St George)

The church was built in the middle of the 16th century and follows the monastic architecture of Macedonia during the Ottoman rule, which does not differ in design and function from that of the Byzantine era. The architectural type that dominates is the so-called Athonite, cruciform inscribed, which has as its main feature the side niches part intended for the dances of the psalters, and the large narthex, the litti. The central area is covered with a large cross-section of excellent construction.

References

Populated places in Thessaloniki (regional unit)
Thessaloniki